Love Keeps Going is a 2011 Taiwanese drama starring Cyndi Wang, Mike He and Eli Shih. It is based on Taiwanese novel, Wang's Love Song.

It was first broadcast in Taiwan on free-to-air China Television (CTV) from 5 June 2011, every Sunday at 22:00 to 23:30 and on cable TV Gala Television (GTV) Variety Show/CH 28 on 11 June 2011, every Sunday at 21:00 to 22:30. The premiere episode on CTV achieved an average rating of 1.84.

Synopsis

Zha Mei Le (Cyndi Wang) is illustrious, humble and hardworking. She is also well-behaved, obedient, caring and kind. Her vast collection of certificates (including IT expertise to a baking license) is a testament to her enthusiasm. Despite her faultless exterior, she hides a bittersweet past. An accidental incident of eavesdropping led her to discover that neither of her parents, while going through their divorce, wanted custody of her, purely due to her being stupid. As a result, she has since worked hard to develop skills, gaining love and approval in the process.

Her boyfriend, Han Yi Feng (Eli Shih) still falls in love with her, as a result of her mass abilities and generous nature. His mother and sister both are impressed by and greatly admire her from the start of their relationship. Mei Le even helps achieve what she thinks is Yi Feng's dream of opening and running a bakery. There is a slight marring of this idyllic plot, with the introduction of Yi Feng's brother, the spoilt, rich and famous Han Yi Lie (Mike He). Mei Le makes a terrible first impression on him but she is determined to change that.

All seems well with the couple engaged to be married. However, in a cruel twist of fate, Yi Feng shows his true character and is not at all what Mei Le thought him to be. When she finds out that their relationship is not as pure as she thought it was, she is set with the difficult task of rediscovering herself, along with help, and in the process, learns to trust and fall in love again.

Cast

Music
 Opening theme song: "不哭" (Don't Cry) by Cyndi Wang
 Ending theme song: "黏黏黏黏" (Stick to You) by Cyndi Wang

Insert song
 "下一頁的我" (The Next Page of Me) by Cyndi Wang
 "心中的花園" (Hearts Garden) by Mike He
 "寂寞暴風雨" (Lonely Storm) by Blue Bird Flying Fish
 "情人結" (To Love) by Jing Chang
 "起来" (Up) by Daniel Chan

Reception

Source: China Times

Rival dramas on air at the same time: 
 Taiwan Television (TTV): Love You / Office Girls
 Chinese Television System (CTS): They Are Flying
 Formosa Television (FTV): Together for Love / Hayate the Combat Butler

International broadcast
 Singapore – Channel U on 11 June 2011 from 21:30 to 23:00.
Thailand – Channel 7 on 13 January 2014 from 02:00 to 03:00

References

External links
 Love Keeps Going at CTV
 Love Keeps Going at GTV

Gala Television original programming
China Television original programming
2011 Taiwanese television series debuts
2011 Taiwanese television series endings
Hakka culture in Taiwan
Television shows based on Taiwanese novels